Jeffrey Mathews (19 May 1943 – 6 June 2013) was a South African cricketer. He played three first-class matches for Natal between 1974 and 1977.

References

External links
 

1943 births
2013 deaths
South African cricketers
KwaZulu-Natal cricketers
People from Louis Trichardt
Sportspeople from Limpopo